Walter Charles Schwank (May 20, 1912 – February 2, 2009) was an American football coach and college athletics administrator. He served as the head football coach at Coe College in Cedar Rapids, Iowa from 1955 to 1959, compiling a record of 25–7, and as the athletic director at the University of Montana from 1961 to 1967.

Head coaching record

College

References

1912 births
2009 deaths
American football tackles
Coe Kohawks football coaches
Coe Kohawks football players
Iowa Hawkeyes football coaches
Montana Grizzlies and Lady Griz athletic directors
South Dakota State Jackrabbits football coaches
High school football coaches in Iowa